The City of Box Hill was a local government area about  east of Melbourne, the state capital of Victoria, Australia.

History

Box Hill was originally included in the Nunawading Road District, established on 7 August 1857, which became the Shire of Nunawading on 4 May 1872. On 26 May 1925, the eastern part was severed, to create the Shire of Blackburn & Mitcham (which later became the City of Nunawading), with the remainder becoming the Borough of Box Hill on 23 December 1925. It was proclaimed a city on 28 April 1927.

On 15 December 1994, the City of Box Hill was abolished, and along with the City of Nunawading, was merged into the newly created City of Whitehorse.

Council meetings were held at the Box Hill Town Hall, on Bank Street, Box Hill. It is still used for secondary council offices by the City of Whitehorse.

Box Hill has variously supported an eponymous brass band since 1889.

Wards

The City of Box Hill was subdivided into nine wards, each electing one councillor:
 Bennettswood Ward
 Broughton Ward
 Burwood Ward
 Dorking Ward
 Houston Ward
 Kerrimuir Ward
 Koonung Ward
 Mont Albert Ward
 Whitehorse Ward

Suburbs

The City of Box Hill was bounded by Warrigal Road to the west, Koonung Koonung Creek to the north, Middleborough Road to the east and Highbury Road to the south.

 Box Hill*
 Box Hill North
 Box Hill South
 Burwood (shared with the Cities of Camberwell and Waverley)
 Mont Albert
 Mont Albert North
 Surrey Hills (shared with the City of Camberwell)

* Council seat.

Population

* Estimate in the 1958 Victorian Year Book.

Gallery

References

External links
 Victorian Places - Box Hill and Box Hill City

Box Hill
1927 establishments in Australia
1994 disestablishments in Australia